In geometry, a Platonic solid is a convex, regular polyhedron in three-dimensional Euclidean space. Being a regular polyhedron means that the faces are congruent (identical in shape and size) regular polygons (all angles congruent and all edges congruent), and the same number of faces meet at each vertex. There are only five such polyhedra:

Geometers have studied the Platonic solids for thousands of years. They are named for the ancient Greek philosopher Plato who hypothesized in one of his dialogues, the Timaeus, that the classical elements were made of these regular solids.

History 

The Platonic solids have been known since antiquity. It has been suggested that certain carved stone balls created by the late Neolithic people of Scotland represent these shapes; however, these balls have rounded knobs rather than being polyhedral, the numbers of knobs frequently differed from the numbers of vertices of the Platonic solids, there is no ball whose knobs match the 20 vertices of the dodecahedron, and the arrangement of the knobs was not always symmetric.

The ancient Greeks studied the Platonic solids extensively. Some sources (such as Proclus) credit Pythagoras with their discovery. Other evidence suggests that he may have only been familiar with the tetrahedron, cube, and dodecahedron and that the discovery of the octahedron and icosahedron belong to Theaetetus, a contemporary of Plato. In any case, Theaetetus gave a mathematical description of all five and may have been responsible for the first known proof that no other convex regular polyhedra exist.

The Platonic solids are prominent in the philosophy of Plato, their namesake. Plato wrote about them in the dialogue Timaeus  360 B.C. in which he associated each of the four classical elements (earth, air, water, and fire) with a regular solid. Earth was associated with the cube, air with the octahedron, water with the icosahedron, and fire with the tetrahedron. 

Of the fifth Platonic solid, the dodecahedron, Plato obscurely remarked, "...the god used [it] for arranging the constellations on the whole heaven". Aristotle added a fifth element, aithēr (aether in Latin, "ether" in English) and postulated that the heavens were made of this element, but he had no interest in matching it with Plato's fifth solid.

Euclid completely mathematically described the Platonic solids in the Elements, the last book (Book XIII) of which is devoted to their properties. Propositions 13–17 in Book XIII describe the construction of the tetrahedron, octahedron, cube, icosahedron, and dodecahedron in that order. For each solid Euclid finds the ratio of the diameter of the circumscribed sphere to the edge length. In Proposition 18 he argues that there are no further convex regular polyhedra. Andreas Speiser has advocated the view that the construction of the five regular solids is the chief goal of the deductive system canonized in the Elements. Much of the information in Book XIII is probably derived from the work of Theaetetus.

In the 16th century, the German astronomer Johannes Kepler attempted to relate the five extraterrestrial planets known at that time to the five Platonic solids. In Mysterium Cosmographicum, published in 1596, Kepler proposed a model of the Solar System in which the five solids were set inside one another and separated by a series of inscribed and circumscribed spheres. Kepler proposed that the distance relationships between the six planets known at that time could be understood in terms of the five Platonic solids enclosed within a sphere that represented the orbit of Saturn. The six spheres each corresponded to one of the planets (Mercury, Venus, Earth, Mars, Jupiter, and Saturn). The solids were ordered with the innermost being the octahedron, followed by the icosahedron, dodecahedron, tetrahedron, and finally the cube, thereby dictating the structure of the solar system and the distance relationships between the planets by the Platonic solids. In the end, Kepler's original idea had to be abandoned, but out of his research came his three laws of orbital dynamics, the first of which was that the orbits of planets are ellipses rather than circles, changing the course of physics and astronomy.  He also discovered the Kepler solids, which are two nonconvex regular polyhedra.

Cartesian coordinates
For Platonic solids centered at the origin, simple Cartesian coordinates of the vertices are given below.  The Greek letter φ is used to represent the golden ratio  ≈ 1.6180.

The coordinates for the tetrahedron, dodecahedron, and icosahedron are given in two positions such that each can be deduced from the other: in the case of the tetrahedron, by changing all coordinates of sign (central symmetry), or, in the other cases, by exchanging two coordinates (reflection with respect to any of the three diagonal planes).

Both tetrahedral positions make the compound stellated octahedron.

Eight of the vertices of the dodecahedron are shared with the cube. Completing all orientations leads to the compound of five cubes.

Combinatorial properties 
A convex polyhedron is a Platonic solid if and only if

 all its faces are congruent convex regular polygons,
 none of its faces intersect except at their edges, and
 the same number of faces meet at each of its vertices.

Each Platonic solid can therefore be denoted by a symbol {p, q} where

 p is the number of edges (or, equivalently, vertices) of each face, and
 q is the number of faces (or, equivalently, edges) that meet at each vertex.

The symbol {p, q}, called the Schläfli symbol, gives a combinatorial description of the polyhedron. The Schläfli symbols of the five Platonic solids are given in the table below.

All other combinatorial information about these solids, such as total number of vertices (V), edges (E), and faces (F), can be determined from p and q. Since any edge joins two vertices and has two adjacent faces we must have:

 

The other relationship between these values is given by Euler's formula:

 

This can be proved in many ways. Together these three relationships completely determine V, E, and F:

 

Swapping p and q interchanges F and V while leaving E unchanged. For a geometric interpretation of this property, see .

As a configuration
The elements of a polyhedron can be expressed in a configuration matrix. The rows and columns correspond to vertices, edges, and faces. The diagonal numbers say how many of each element occur in the whole polyhedron. The nondiagonal numbers say how many of the column's element occur in or at the row's element. Dual pairs of polyhedra have their configuration matrices rotated 180 degrees from each other.

Classification 
The classical result is that only five convex regular polyhedra exist. Two common arguments below demonstrate no more than five Platonic solids can exist, but positively demonstrating the existence of any given solid is a separate question—one that requires an explicit construction.

Geometric proof 

The following geometric argument is very similar to the one given by Euclid in the Elements:

Topological proof 
A purely topological proof can be made using only combinatorial information about the solids. The key is Euler's observation that V − E + F = 2, and the fact that pF = 2E = qV, where p stands for the number of edges of each face and q for the number of edges meeting at each vertex. Combining these equations one obtains the equation

 

Simple algebraic manipulation then gives

 

Since E is strictly positive we must have

 

Using the fact that p and q must both be at least 3, one can easily see that there are only five possibilities for {p, q}:
 {3, 3}, {4, 3}, {3, 4}, {5, 3}, {3, 5}.

Geometric properties

Angles 
There are a number of angles associated with each Platonic solid. The dihedral angle is the interior angle between any two face planes. The dihedral angle, θ, of the solid {p,q} is given by the formula

 

This is sometimes more conveniently expressed in terms of the tangent by

 

The quantity h (called the Coxeter number) is 4, 6, 6, 10, and 10 for the tetrahedron, cube, octahedron, dodecahedron, and icosahedron respectively.

The angular deficiency at the vertex of a polyhedron is the difference between the sum of the face-angles at that vertex and 2. The defect, δ, at any vertex of the Platonic solids {p,q} is

 

By a theorem of Descartes, this is equal to 4 divided by the number of vertices (i.e. the total defect at all vertices is 4).

The three-dimensional analog of a plane angle is a solid angle. The solid angle, Ω, at the vertex of a Platonic solid is given in terms of the dihedral angle by

 

This follows from the spherical excess formula for a spherical polygon and the fact that the vertex figure of the polyhedron {p,q} is a regular q-gon.

The solid angle of a face subtended from the center of a platonic solid is equal to the solid angle of a full sphere (4 steradians) divided by the number of faces. This is equal to the angular deficiency of its dual.

The various angles associated with the Platonic solids are tabulated below. The numerical values of the solid angles are given in steradians. The constant φ =  is the golden ratio.

Radii, area, and volume 
Another virtue of regularity is that the Platonic solids all possess three concentric spheres:

 the circumscribed sphere that passes through all the vertices,
 the midsphere that is tangent to each edge at the midpoint of the edge, and
 the inscribed sphere that is tangent to each face at the center of the face.

The radii of these spheres are called the circumradius, the midradius, and the inradius. These are the distances from the center of the polyhedron to the vertices, edge midpoints, and face centers respectively. The circumradius R and the inradius r of the solid {p, q} with edge length a are given by

 

where θ is the dihedral angle. The midradius ρ is given by

 

where h is the quantity used above in the definition of the dihedral angle (h = 4, 6, 6, 10, or 10). The ratio of the circumradius to the inradius is symmetric in p and q:

 

The surface area, A, of a Platonic solid {p, q} is easily computed as area of a regular p-gon times the number of faces F. This is:

 

The volume is computed as F times the volume of the pyramid whose base is a regular p-gon and whose height is the inradius r. That is,

 

The following table lists the various radii of the Platonic solids together with their surface area and volume. The overall size is fixed by taking the edge length, a, to be equal to 2.

The constants φ and ξ in the above are given by

 

Among the Platonic solids, either the dodecahedron or the icosahedron may be seen as the best approximation to the sphere. The icosahedron has the largest number of faces and the largest dihedral angle, it hugs its inscribed sphere the most tightly, and its surface area to volume ratio is closest to that of a sphere of the same size (i.e. either the same surface area or the same volume.) The dodecahedron, on the other hand, has the smallest angular defect, the largest vertex solid angle, and it fills out its circumscribed sphere the most.

Point in space
For an arbitrary point in the space of a Platonic solid with circumradius R, whose distances to the centroid of the Platonic solid and its n vertices are L and di respectively, and

,

we have

For all five Platonic solids, we have

If di are the distances from the n vertices of the Platonic solid to any point on its circumscribed sphere, then

Rupert property
A polyhedron P is said to have the Rupert property if a polyhedron of the same or larger size and the same shape as P can pass through a hole in P.
All five Platonic solids have this property.

Symmetry

Dual polyhedra 

Every polyhedron has a dual (or "polar") polyhedron with faces and vertices interchanged. The dual of every Platonic solid is another Platonic solid, so that we can arrange the five solids into dual pairs.

 The tetrahedron is self-dual (i.e. its dual is another tetrahedron).
 The cube and the octahedron form a dual pair.
 The dodecahedron and the icosahedron form a dual pair.

If a polyhedron has Schläfli symbol {p, q}, then its dual has the symbol {q, p}. Indeed, every combinatorial property of one Platonic solid can be interpreted as another combinatorial property of the dual.

One can construct the dual polyhedron by taking the vertices of the dual to be the centers of the faces of the original figure. Connecting the centers of adjacent faces in the original forms the edges of the dual and thereby interchanges the number of faces and vertices while maintaining the number of edges.

More generally, one can dualize a Platonic solid with respect to a sphere of radius d concentric with the solid. The radii (R, ρ, r) of a solid and those of its dual (R*, ρ*, r*) are related by

 

Dualizing with respect to the midsphere (d = ρ) is often convenient because the midsphere has the same relationship to both polyhedra. Taking d2 = Rr yields a dual solid with the same circumradius and inradius (i.e. R* = R and r* = r).

Symmetry groups 
In mathematics, the concept of symmetry is studied with the notion of a mathematical group. Every polyhedron has an associated symmetry group, which is the set of all transformations (Euclidean isometries) which leave the polyhedron invariant. The order of the symmetry group is the number of symmetries of the polyhedron. One often distinguishes between the full symmetry group, which includes reflections, and the proper symmetry group, which includes only rotations.

The symmetry groups of the Platonic solids are a special class of three-dimensional point groups known as polyhedral groups. The high degree of symmetry of the Platonic solids can be interpreted in a number of ways. Most importantly, the vertices of each solid are all equivalent under the action of the symmetry group, as are the edges and faces. One says the action of the symmetry group is transitive on the vertices, edges, and faces. In fact, this is another way of defining regularity of a polyhedron: a polyhedron is regular if and only if it is vertex-uniform, edge-uniform, and face-uniform.

There are only three symmetry groups associated with the Platonic solids rather than five, since the symmetry group of any polyhedron coincides with that of its dual. This is easily seen by examining the construction of the dual polyhedron. Any symmetry of the original must be a symmetry of the dual and vice versa. The three polyhedral groups are:

 the tetrahedral group T,
 the octahedral group O (which is also the symmetry group of the cube), and
 the icosahedral group I (which is also the symmetry group of the dodecahedron).

The orders of the proper (rotation) groups are 12, 24, and 60 respectively – precisely twice the number of edges in the respective polyhedra. The orders of the full symmetry groups are twice as much again (24, 48, and 120). See (Coxeter 1973) for a derivation of these facts. All Platonic solids except the tetrahedron are centrally symmetric, meaning they are preserved under reflection through the origin.

The following table lists the various symmetry properties of the Platonic solids. The symmetry groups listed are the full groups with the rotation subgroups given in parenthesis (likewise for the number of symmetries). Wythoff's kaleidoscope construction is a method for constructing polyhedra directly from their symmetry groups. They are listed for reference Wythoff's symbol for each of the Platonic solids.

In nature and technology 

The tetrahedron, cube, and octahedron all occur naturally in crystal structures. These by no means exhaust the numbers of possible forms of crystals. However, neither the regular icosahedron nor the regular dodecahedron are amongst them. One of the forms, called the pyritohedron (named for the group of minerals of which it is typical) has twelve pentagonal faces, arranged in the same pattern as the faces of the regular dodecahedron. The faces of the pyritohedron are, however, not regular, so the pyritohedron is also not regular. Allotropes of boron and many boron compounds, such as boron carbide, include discrete B12 icosahedra within their crystal structures. Carborane acids also have molecular structures approximating regular icosahedra.

In the early 20th century, Ernst Haeckel described (Haeckel, 1904) a number of species of Radiolaria, some of whose skeletons are shaped like various regular polyhedra. Examples include Circoporus octahedrus, Circogonia icosahedra, Lithocubus geometricus and Circorrhegma dodecahedra. The shapes of these creatures should be obvious from their names.

Many viruses, such as the herpes virus, have the shape of a regular icosahedron. Viral structures are built of repeated identical protein subunits and the icosahedron is the easiest shape to assemble using these subunits. A regular polyhedron is used because it can be built from a single basic unit protein used over and over again; this saves space in the viral genome.

In meteorology and climatology, global numerical models of atmospheric flow are of increasing interest which employ geodesic grids that are based on an icosahedron (refined by triangulation) instead of the more commonly used longitude/latitude grid. This has the advantage of evenly distributed spatial resolution without singularities (i.e. the poles) at the expense of somewhat greater numerical difficulty.

Geometry of space frames is often based on platonic solids. In the MERO system, Platonic solids are used for naming convention of various space frame configurations. For example, O+T refers to a configuration made of one half of octahedron and a tetrahedron.

Several Platonic hydrocarbons have been synthesised, including cubane and dodecahedrane and not tetrahedrane.

Platonic solids are often used to make dice, because dice of these shapes can be made fair. 6-sided dice are very common, but the other numbers are commonly used in role-playing games. Such dice are commonly referred to as dn where n is the number of faces (d8, d20, etc.); see dice notation for more details.

These shapes frequently show up in other games or puzzles. Puzzles similar to a Rubik's Cube come in all five shapes – see magic polyhedra.

Liquid crystals with symmetries of Platonic solids 
For the intermediate material phase called liquid crystals, the existence of such symmetries was first proposed in 1981 by H. Kleinert and K. Maki.
In aluminum the icosahedral structure was discovered three years after this by Dan Shechtman, which earned him the Nobel Prize in Chemistry in 2011.

Related polyhedra and polytopes

Uniform polyhedra 
There exist four regular polyhedra that are not convex, called Kepler–Poinsot polyhedra. These all have icosahedral symmetry and may be obtained as stellations of the dodecahedron and the icosahedron.

The next most regular convex polyhedra after the Platonic solids are the cuboctahedron, which is a rectification of the cube and the octahedron, and the icosidodecahedron, which is a rectification of the dodecahedron and the icosahedron (the rectification of the self-dual tetrahedron is a regular octahedron). These are both quasi-regular, meaning that they are vertex- and edge-uniform and have regular faces, but the faces are not all congruent (coming in two different classes). They form two of the thirteen Archimedean solids, which are the convex uniform polyhedra with polyhedral symmetry. Their duals, the rhombic dodecahedron and rhombic triacontahedron, are edge- and face-transitive, but their faces are not regular and their vertices come in two types each; they are two of the thirteen Catalan solids.

The uniform polyhedra form a much broader class of polyhedra. These figures are vertex-uniform and have one or more types of regular or star polygons for faces. These include all the polyhedra mentioned above together with an infinite set of prisms, an infinite set of antiprisms, and 53 other non-convex forms.

The Johnson solids are convex polyhedra which have regular faces but are not uniform. Among them are five of the eight convex deltahedra, which have identical, regular faces (all equilateral triangles) but are not uniform. (The other three convex deltahedra are the Platonic tetrahedron, octahedron, and icosahedron.)

Regular tessellations 

The three regular tessellations of the plane are closely related to the Platonic solids. Indeed, one can view the Platonic solids as regular tessellations of the sphere. This is done by projecting each solid onto a concentric sphere. The faces project onto regular spherical polygons which exactly cover the sphere. Spherical tilings provide two infinite additional sets of regular tilings, the hosohedra, {2,n} with 2 vertices at the poles, and lune faces, and the dual dihedra, {n,2} with 2 hemispherical faces and regularly spaced vertices on the equator. Such tesselations would be degenerate in true 3D space as polyhedra.

One can show that every regular tessellation of the sphere is characterized by a pair of integers {p, q} with  +  > . Likewise, a regular tessellation of the plane is characterized by the condition  +  = . There are three possibilities:

In a similar manner, one can consider regular tessellations of the hyperbolic plane. These are characterized by the condition  +  < . There is an infinite family of such tessellations.

Higher dimensions 

In more than three dimensions, polyhedra generalize to polytopes, with higher-dimensional convex regular polytopes being the equivalents of the three-dimensional Platonic solids.

In the mid-19th century the Swiss mathematician Ludwig Schläfli discovered the four-dimensional analogues of the Platonic solids, called convex regular 4-polytopes. There are exactly six of these figures; five are analogous to the Platonic solids : 5-cell as {3,3,3}, 16-cell as {3,3,4}, 600-cell as {3,3,5}, tesseract as {4,3,3}, and 120-cell as {5,3,3}, and a sixth one, the self-dual 24-cell, {3,4,3}.

In all dimensions higher than four, there are only three convex regular polytopes: the simplex as {3,3,...,3}, the hypercube as {4,3,...,3}, and the cross-polytope as {3,3,...,4}. In three dimensions, these coincide with the tetrahedron as {3,3}, the cube as {4,3}, and the octahedron as {3,4}.

See also

Citations

General and cited sources 
 
 
 
 
  Gardner, Martin (1987). The 2nd Scientific American Book of Mathematical Puzzles & Diversions, University of Chicago Press, Chapter 1: The Five Platonic Solids, 
 Haeckel, Ernst, E. (1904). Kunstformen der Natur. Available as Haeckel, E. (1998); Art forms in nature, Prestel USA. .
 Kepler. Johannes Strena seu de nive sexangula (On the Six-Cornered Snowflake), 1611 paper by Kepler which discussed the reason for the six-angled shape of the snow crystals and the forms and symmetries in nature. Talks about platonic solids.
 
 
 
 
 Wildberg, Christian (1988). John Philoponus' Criticism of Aristotle's Theory of Aether.  Walter de Gruyter. pp. 11–12. .

External links 

 Platonic solids at Encyclopaedia of Mathematics
 
 
 Book XIII of Euclid's Elements.
 Interactive 3D Polyhedra in Java
 Platonic Solids in Visual Polyhedra
 Solid Body Viewer is an interactive 3D polyhedron viewer which allows you to save the model in svg, stl or obj format.
 Interactive Folding/Unfolding Platonic Solids  in Java
 Paper models of the Platonic solids created using nets generated by Stella software
 Platonic Solids Free paper models(nets)
 
 Teaching Math with Art student-created models
 Teaching Math with Art teacher instructions for making models
 Frames of Platonic Solids images of algebraic surfaces
 Platonic Solids with some formula derivations
 How to make four platonic solids from a cube

 
Multi-dimensional geometry